Norwood Junction railway station is a National Rail station in South Norwood in the London Borough of Croydon, south London and is in Travelcard Zone 4.

The station is managed by London Overground and trains are operated by London Overground, Thameslink and Southern.

History

The station has occupied two sites under three different names.

Jolly-sailor and Norwood stations 

In 1839 the London and Croydon Railway opened Jolly-sailor station — "Jolly-sailor near Beulah Spa" on fares lists and timetables — at the north end of the High Street, adjacent to the Portland Road level crossing. From 1841 the lines through Norwood were used by the London and Brighton Railway and from 1842 the South Eastern Railway, but neither of these companies used the station. (The Jolly Sailor is a pub — originally the Jolly Sailor Inn — on the corner of Portland Road and High Street. The original pub was rebuilt around the late 1860s.) 

In 1844 the L&CR was given parliamentary authority to test an experimental atmospheric railway system on the railway. A pumping station was built on Portland Road to create a vacuum in a continuous pipe located centrally between the rails. A piston extended downwards from the trains into a slit in the pipe, with trains blown towards the pumping station by atmospheric pressure. The pumping station was in a Gothic style, with a very tall ornate tower that served both as a chimney and as an exhaust vent for air pumped from the propulsion tube.

As part of the works for the atmospheric system, the world's first railway flyover was constructed beyond the south end of the station to carry the atmospheric line over the conventional London & Brighton Railway steam line. At the same time the level crossing at Portland Road was replaced by a low bridge across the road.

In July 1846 the L&CR merged with the L&BR to form the London Brighton and South Coast Railway, and the station was renamed Norwood in the same year - it became Norwood Junction by 1856. The LB&SCR abandoned atmospheric propulsion in 1847.

Following construction of lines to Crystal Palace the station closed on 1 June 1859 and was replaced by the current station located at the end of a short approach road off the south side of the A213 road. The original station building was used as a private house until the 1960s, when it was demolished.

Norwood Junction rail accident

The Norwood Junction railway crash occurred on 1 May 1891, when the cast-iron bridge over Portland Road fractured under an express train from Brighton to London.

The present station

The station opened on 1 June 1859 by the LB&SCR. It was renamed Norwood Junction and South Norwood on 1 October 1910 but reverted to its original name on 13 June 1955 though some tickets and publications continued to use the pre-1955 name for sometime thereafter.
There are seven platforms but only five are in use. Ticket barriers control access to all platforms. The LB&SCR goods shed built in 1865 remains in place, now used as railway offices.

Platforms 1 & 2 
Platform 1 is the first platform when entering via the main entrance and is the only platform accessible without having to negotiate the subway via stairs. They mainly come from West Croydon, Sutton and Epsom. The platform is also used for London Overground and Southern trains.

Platform 2 serves the same track as Platform 1 but passengers are not able to join or alight as the doors open only on the Platform 1 side. This is due to the live rail being on the side nearest to Platform 2. Platform 2 also is used for platform alteration.

Platform 3 

Platform 3 is mainly used for northbound trains terminating at Bedford via London Bridge. Many passengers use this platform to go to central London, London St Pancras International & Luton Airport Parkway. The platform serves both fast and stopping services, and is mainly used by Thameslink.

Platform 4 
Platform 4 is mainly used for southbound trains terminating at Gatwick Airport. The platform serves both fast trains and stopping services, and is also mainly used by Thameslink.

Platform 5 
Platform 5 is mainly used for southbound trains terminating at West Croydon, Epsom and Sutton. Most trains stop at this platform and many travellers from London alight here. Services come from London Bridge, Highbury & Islington and London Victoria. The platform is used by both Southern and London Overground.

Platform 6 
Platform 6 is mainly used for southbound trains terminating at Coulsdon Town, West Croydon, Caterham and Tattenham Corner; it is also used for platform alterations.  Trains come from London Victoria and London Bridge. Platform 6 is chiefly used by Southern.

Platform 7 
Platform 7 is disused and the line is covered by vegetation. However, with the planned two-year blockade of Thameslink trains through Central London while London Bridge station was being reconstructed, Network Rail considered reinstating and electrifying this line as a 'dead-end'. To achieve the change the lead to the down spur at Bromley Junction would have been being removed to the up line and a facing crossover put into place west of it. To provide the necessary pathing northbound the trains would have used the same spur line, which would have become reversible to the resited point on the up line at Bromley Junction. Despite safety problems for the user-operated level crossing into the track maintenance depot on the former steam shed site (because of restricted sighting under Goat House bridge) having apparently been resolved, the changes have been postponed until the work at London Bridge is complete. This is mainly because it was judged that the cost did not justify the change, at least until a general renewal of the signal and control installation is undertaken.

Services
Services at Norwood Junction are operated by Southern, Thameslink and London Overground.

Southern

The typical off-peak service in trains per hour is:
 2 tph to  via 
 2 tph to  via 

On Sundays, the services to Epsom and Tattenham Corner do not run. Passengers for Tattenham Corner have to change at Purley.

Southern services at Norwood Junction are operated using  EMUs.

Thameslink

The typical off-peak service in trains per hour is:
 2 tph to  via London Bridge
 2 tph to Three Bridges via 

Thameslink services at Norwood Junction are operated using  EMUs

London Overground

The typical off-peak service in trains per hour is:
 4 tph to  via 
 6 tph to 

London Overground services at Norwood Junction are operated using  EMUs

Marshalling yard
The LB&SCR constructed a large marshalling yard to the south of the station during the 1870s, extended in the early 1880s. At their height the yards on both sides of the line each had over 30 carriage roads. Because of the narrow nature of the site they were laid in clusters of six to eight, one beyond another, with the lead to each forming an individual headshunt. With dwindling freight traffic the yard fell into disuse by the 1980s and the tracks were relaid to accommodate an enlarged Selhurst Depot.

Motive Power Depot/Norwood Cable Depot

The Southern Railway opened a five-road motive power depot with a 65 ft (19.8 metre) turntable in 1935, to serve the marshalling yard. It replaced a shed at West Croydon. This depot was closed in 1964 and demolished in 1966.

Following the demolition of the locomotive depot British Rail then redeveloped the site into a traction cable depot for maintaining the railway.

Connections
Norwood Junction is well served by bus routes, with three bus stops including two bus stands close by. On the Portland Road side are two stops for routes 197 (Croydon Town Centre – Norwood Junction – Peckham) and 312 (South Croydon, Bus Garage – East Croydon – Norwood Junction). The High Street 'Clocktower' stop serves routes 75 (Croydon Town Centre – Penge – Lewisham Station), 157 (Morden – West Croydon – Crystal Palace) and 410 (Wallington – Croydon – Crystal Palace). The Grosvenor Road stop serves routes 130 (New Addington – Addington Village – Thornton Heath, Parchmore Road) and 196 (Norwood Junction – Brixton – Elephant and Castle).

Route 75 was formerly a 24-hour route but that facility was withdrawn in favour of a higher frequency of buses on a Sunday by Selkent when it took the service over from Stagecoach London. Metrobus won the contract from April 2009 and works the route from its Croydon garage. Nowadays the route is operated by Stagecoach London. The stop on Night Bus route N68 is half a mile away on Whitehorse Lane. Other service operators are Arriva London, Abellio and Metrobus.

Latest Improvements

Thameslink Programme

The Thameslink Programme (formerly known as Thameslink 2000), is a £3.5 billion major project to expand the Thameslink network from 51 to 172 stations extending northwards to Bedford, Peterborough, Cambridge and King's Lynn and southwards to Guildford, Eastbourne, Horsham, Hove to Littlehampton, East Grinstead, Ashford and Dartford. The project includes the lengthening of platforms, station remodelling, new railway infrastructure (e.g. viaducts) and additional rolling stock. The new Thameslink timetable for Norwood Junction started 20 May 2018. "Norwood Junction gain[ed] an all-day-long Thameslink service to Bedford via Blackfriars and St Pancras, with two trains per hour to Epsom via Sutton" and timetables will continue being expanded and adjusted into 2019.

Future

Norwood Junction station Upgrade. 
Network Rail have made proposals to upgrade Norwood Junction. The scheme is a key part of Network Rail's long-term plans to unblock the railway bottleneck in the Croydon area, enabling the operation of more frequent and more reliable services on the Brighton Main Line and its branch lines.

Network Rail proposals 

 Modify the existing track and platform layouts
 Provide a track layout that allows more trains to run through and stop at the station
 Reconfigure the platforms to provide dedicated island platforms for northbound and southbound services
 Provide dedicated tracks away from the platforms, for fast non‑stopping trains.

Lengthen and widen platforms 

 Lengthen platforms to allow full length (12-car) trains to stop and open all their doors at the station.
 Widen all platforms to provide more space for passengers.

Provide step-free access 

 Provide two new footbridges, one with lifts to provide step-free access to all platforms.

Upgrade the signalling 

 Upgrade the signalling system to give signallers the ability to recover the service more quickly when delays occur.

The benefits 
The proposals for Norwood Junction station would deliver regional and local benefits.

More frequent and more reliable services 
The proposals form a key part of the wider plans to unblock the Croydon bottleneck, but they would also have benefits as a standalone project, helping to improve reliability and run more frequent services.

Increased station capacity 
Widening and lengthening the platforms would provide more space for passengers to wait and get on and off train services.
Providing two footbridges would reduce congestion and allow passengers to move more freely through the station.

Network Rail's plans 
Proposals are for the station to be constructed entirely within the railway boundary, and Network Rail would seek consent for these changes through the usual planning process.

The works are not proposed to form part of the Transport and Works Act Order application for other proposed upgrade works between East Croydon station and the “Selhurst triangle”, which Network Rail has been consulting on. Further consultations on the Norwood proposals were due to take place in 2020.

The proposals for Norwood Junction station are unfunded, as are the wider proposals to upgrade the Brighton Main Line. Over the months and years ahead Network Rail will continue to make the case for investment in the Brighton Main Line railway 2020.

In literature
It is from this station that Jonas Oldacre takes his train to London Bridge in Arthur Conan Doyle's Sherlock Holmes story "The Adventure of the Norwood Builder" (1903).

References

External links

Railway stations in the London Borough of Croydon
Former London, Brighton and South Coast Railway stations
Railway stations in Great Britain opened in 1839 
Railway stations in Great Britain closed in 1859
Railway stations in Great Britain opened in 1859 
Railway stations served by London Overground
Railway stations served by Govia Thameslink Railway